Jeremy Guard (born 11 July 1970) is a former Australian rules footballer who played for Fitzroy in the Australian Football League (AFL) during the 1990s.

Career

Guard was one of six Claremont players selected in the first seven picks of the 1991 AFL draft. He didn't miss a game in any of his first two seasons, playing all 42 home and away fixtures. In just his ninth appearance, against Collingwood at Princes Park, he kicked three goals and in the dying seconds delivered the ball into the forward 50 to allow Paul Roos to snap the winning goal.

He returned to Claremont in 1996 and captained them to the West Australian Football League premiership that year, with a two-point win over East Perth in the Grand Final.

He currently coaches at the Heidelberg Junior Football Club.

References

Holmesby, Russell and Main, Jim (2007). The Encyclopedia of AFL Footballers. 7th ed. Melbourne: Bas Publishing.

1970 births
Living people
Fitzroy Football Club players
Claremont Football Club players
Australian rules footballers from Western Australia